Parapercis punctulata, the spotted sandperch, is a fish species in the sandperch family, Pinguipedidae. It is found in the Western Indian Ocean, including the Seychelles, the Amirantes, Mozambique, Mauritius, and northern Natal, South Africa. Recently recorded from Reunion.

References

Heemstra, P.C., 1986. Mugiloididae. p. 739-741. In M.M. Smith and P.C. Heemstra (eds.) Smiths' sea fishes. Springer-Verlag, Berlin.

Pinguipedidae
Taxa named by Georges Cuvier
Fish described in 1829